Chicken salad is any salad with chicken as a main ingredient. Other common ingredients may include mayonnaise, hard-boiled egg, celery, onion, pepper, pickles (or pickle relish) and a variety of mustards.

Description
In Canada and the United States, "chicken salad" refers to either any salad with chicken, or a specific mixed salad consisting primarily of chopped chicken meat and a binder, such as mayonnaise, salad dressing or cream cheese. Like tuna salad and egg salad, it may be served on top of lettuce, tomato, avocado, or some combination of these. It may also be used for sandwiches. Typically it is made with leftover cooked or canned chicken. It may also refer to a garden salad with fried, grilled, or roasted chicken (usually cut up or diced) on top.

In Europe and Asia the salad may be complemented by any number of dressings, or no dressing at all, and the salad constituents can vary from traditional leaves and vegetables, to pastas, couscous, noodles or rice.

Early American chicken salad recipes can be found in 19th-century Southern cookbooks, including Sarah Rutledge's The Carolina Housewife: Or, House and Home (1847) and Abby Fisher's What Mrs. Fisher Knows About Old Southern Cooking (1881). Rutledge details a recipe for "A Salad To Be Eaten With Cold Meat Or Fowl" that explains how to make a mayonnaise from scratch, before adding it to cold meats (chicken and seafood). 

Abby Fisher similarly describes making a homemade mayonnaise, before adding it to chicken and white celery.

One of the first American forms of chicken salad was served by Town Meats in Wakefield, Rhode Island, in 1863. The original owner, Liam Gray, mixed his leftover chicken with mayonnaise, tarragon, and grapes. This became such a popular item that the meat market was converted to a delicatessen.

Chicken salad is among the Fourth of July foods listed by The American System of Cookery (1847).

See also 
 Chicken Salad Chick − a fast casual chain restaurant that specializes in chicken salad
 Chicken sandwich
 List of chicken dishes
 List of sandwiches
 Coronation chicken
 Chinese chicken salad

References 

Salads
Sandwiches
American chicken dishes
Canadian chicken dishes
Chinese chicken dishes
British chicken dishes
British salads
Independence Day (United States) foods